Hicattee is a village in the Toledo District of Belize. In 2010, the village had a population of 363, mostly members of the Qʼeqchiʼ and Mopan peoples. The name of the village refers to a species of turtle called Hickatee (Dermatemys mawii).

Geography 
The village is located on the Southern Highway, at the western turnoff to Silver Creek. The nearest villages are Big Falls to the south and Silver Creek to the north.

Climate 
According to the Köppen climate classification, Hicattee has a tropical rainforest climate (displayed as Af on climate maps).

References 

Populated places in Toledo District
Toledo West